Niklas Landin Jacobsen (born 19 December 1988) is a Danish handballer for THW Kiel and the Denmark national team.

He has previously played for Rhein-Neckar Löwen. He is European Champion with the Danish national team, after winning the 2012 Championship in Serbia, defeating the host nation in the final, 21–19. Niklas Landin is the captain of the Denmark national team.

In 2011 and 2013, he won silver medal at the World Men's Handball Championship. In 2016, he was part of the Danish team that won Olympic gold. With the Danish national team, he won the 2019 World Men's Handball Championship. He is the older brother of fellow THW Kiel player and Danish international Magnus Landin Jacobsen. Landin Jacobsen was named the IHF World Player of the Year for 2019 and for 2021. He was the first player to be named two consecutive times. In 2021, he won the 2021 World Men's Handball Championship, posting a save rate of 30%.

Club career

GOG Svendborg TGI
In 2006 Landin signed with GOG Svendborg TGI. He stayed with the club until the start of 2010, where the club faced financial distress and players were allowed to negotiate with other clubs.

Bjerringbro-Silkeborg
Landin signed with Bjerringbro-Silkeborg a contract starting from the 2010 season, but due to GOG Svendborg financial distress, Landin joined BSV in the beginning of 2010. He quickly became first choice and remained with club until 2012.

Rhein-Neckar Löwen
Landin joined the club on a three-year deal, starting 2012–13 season. He was a part of the team that won the 2012–13 EHF Cup.

THW Kiel
On 7 August 2014, THW Kiel announced that Landin would join the club on a three-year contract, starting from the 2015 season. He won the 2015 Super Cup with THW Kiel in a close match against SG Flensburg-Handewitt.

Honours
EHF Champions League:
: 2020
EHF Cup:
: 2013, 2019
German Championship:
: 2019/20, 2020/21
DHB-Pokal:
: 2017, 2019, 2022
German Super Cup:
: 2015
Danish Championship:
: 2007
: 2011, 2012
: 2010
Danish Handball Cup:
: 2007, 2008

Individual awards
 IHF World Player of the Year – Men: 2019, 2021
 All-Star Goalkeeper of the Olympic Games: 2016
 All-Star Goalkeeper of the World Championship: 2013, 2019
 All-Star Goalkeeper of the European Championship: 2014
 All-Star Goalkeeper of the Youth World Championship: 2007
 Danish Player of the Year: 2012, 2014, 2020
Danish National team Player of the year: 2014, 2020, 2021
 Handball-Bundesliga Best Goalkeeper: 2014, 2015, 2017
All-Star Goalkeeper of the EHF Champions League: 2014, 2016, 2020, 2021, 2022
Handball Player of the Year in Germany: 2021

References

External links

1988 births
Living people
Danish male handball players
THW Kiel players
Rhein-Neckar Löwen players
Handball-Bundesliga players
Handball players at the 2012 Summer Olympics
Handball players at the 2016 Summer Olympics
Olympic handball players of Denmark
Expatriate handball players
Danish expatriate sportspeople in Germany
Medalists at the 2016 Summer Olympics
Olympic gold medalists for Denmark
Olympic medalists in handball
People from Gladsaxe Municipality
Handball players at the 2020 Summer Olympics
Medalists at the 2020 Summer Olympics
Olympic silver medalists for Denmark
Sportspeople from the Capital Region of Denmark